Bréiner Clemente Castillo Caicedo (born May 5, 1978) is a Colombian goalkeeper currently playing for Boyacá Chicó.

Castillo played professionally for 18 seasons, making appearances for Deportivo Cali, Millonarios, Nacioanl, Deportes Tolima, Medellín, Real Cartagena, Boyacá Chicó, S.D. Aucas (Ecuador) and Deportivo Táchira F.C. (Venezuela). He was also a member of the Senior Colombia squad during the Copa America 2004. He has been called to national team in 2010.

References

1978 births
Living people
Colombian footballers
Deportivo Cali footballers
Millonarios F.C. players
S.D. Aucas footballers
Atlético Nacional footballers
Deportes Tolima footballers
Independiente Medellín footballers
Real Cartagena footballers
Deportivo Táchira F.C. players
Boyacá Chicó F.C. footballers
Envigado F.C. players
Atlético Huila footballers
Categoría Primera A players
Ecuadorian Serie A players
Colombian expatriate footballers
Expatriate footballers in Ecuador
Colombia international footballers
2004 Copa América players
2011 Copa América players
Association football goalkeepers
Sportspeople from Nariño Department